Andrew Staniland (born 1977) is a Canadian composer and guitarist. He is currently a professor of Composition and Electronic Music at the Memorial University of Newfoundland.

Biography
Andrew Staniland was born in Red Deer, Alberta, in 1977. His first instrument was the guitar, and he began playing in heavy-metal bands as a young teen. Staniland began formal studies in jazz and arranging at Grant MacEwan Community College in Edmonton (now MacEwan University), where he also studied composition with Gordon Nicholson. He then studied classical guitar at the University of Lethbridge, Alberta, before obtaining both a Master's and Doctorate degree in Composition from the University of Toronto.

A composer whose work has been performed and broadcast in over 35 countries, Staniland has been commissioned by musicians and ensembles such as cellist Frances-Marie Uitti, Duo Concertante (violinist Nancy Dahn and pianist Timothy Steeves), the Gryphon Trio, and Les Percussions de Strasbourg. He has also been an Affiliate Composer with both the National Arts Centre Orchestra (2002–2004) and the Toronto Symphony Orchestra (2006–2009), and in 2005 was a composer-in-residence at the Centre de Création Musicale Iannis Xenakis in Paris.

In 2010 Staniland joined the faculty of the School of Music at Memorial University of Newfoundland, where he teaches composition and electronic music. There Staniland founded the Memorial ElectroAcoustic Research Lab (MEARL), where he is part of a cross-disciplinary research team that has created the Mune, an electronic music performance instrument that "combines the functionality of a MIDI controller ... with the expressiveness and simplicity of an acoustic instrument."

Staniland is an Associate Composer of the Canadian Music Centre, a member of the Canadian League of Composers, and an inaugural member of the College of New Scholars, Artists and Scientists of the Royal Society of Canada.

Honours and awards
Staniland has been the recipient of many prestigious awards, including a 2018 ECMA Award for Classical Composition of the Year (for The River is Within Us), the 2016 Terra Nova Young Innovator Award, the National Grand Prize of EVOLUTION (presented in 2009 by CBC Radio 2/Espace Musique and The Banff Centre), and the 2004 Karen Keiser Prize in Canadian Music. He has also received three Juno nominations.

Education
B.Mus., University of Lethbridge
M.Mus., University of Toronto
D.M.A., University of Toronto

Compositions

Chamber music
Exit Eden (2017) for flute and harp
Hypernova (2017) for five flutes
Equations Constellations (2015) for guitar and harp
The Ocean is Full of its Own Collapse (2015) for narrator, piano and violin (based on Lisa Moore's novel February)
Choro: “The Joyful Lament for Villa Lobos” (2014) for 2 guitars
Four Elements (2014) for string quartet
Orion Constellation Theory (2014) Version 2, arranged for two snare drums
Time Travels Light (2014) for percussion quartet
The Beauty of Reason (2013) for cello and harp
Flute Vs Flute (2012) for two flutes (acoustic version)
Flute Vs Flute (2012) arranged for flute and cello
The River is Within Us (2011) for violin and piano
Solstice Songs (2011) for piano trio (violin, cello and piano)
Air (2010) for accordion and percussion
HeX (2010) for percussion sextet
Pentagrams (2010) for two accordions
Pentagrams (2010) arranged for accordion and piano
Devolution (2009) for chamber ensemble
Full Circle (2005) for guitar
After the Crash (2004) for percussionist
Alchemy (2003) for piano and five solo strings
Trio (2002) for harp, piano and percussion
13 Images (2001) for soprano and clarinet
Two Pervasive Miniatures (2000) for small chamber ensemble

Chamber music with electronics
Cassini (2018) for marimba and electronic delay
Orion Constellation Theory (2015) Version 1, for snare drum and electronics
Dreaded Sea Voyage (2013) for classical guitar and electronics
Flute Vs Tape (2012) for flute and tape
Still Turning (2011) for cello and electronics
Talking Down the Tiger (2010) for percussion and live looping
Sudoku (2009) for violin, tabla and electronics
Yupana (2009) for chamber ensemble and electronics
LinguaElastic (2007) for live electronics and spoken word (also an audio installation)
True North (2007) for saxophone and electronics
Adventuremusic: Love her Madly (2006) for two pianos, percussion and electronics
Despite Bright Ideas (2006) for tape
St Croix (2005) for large chamber ensemble and live electronics
Tampobata (2005) for singing pianist and electronics
Tapestry (2003) for clarinet, cello and tape
For violin #3 (2001) for violin and tape

Opera, vocal
Earthquakes and Islands (2016) 8 songs for voice and piano
Aliment Roots (2015) for soprano and cello
Lacrimosa (2015) for soprano and cello
Dear John (2013) for soprano and harp
Execution Songs (2013) for soprano and piano (also arranged for tenor, baritone, and bass)
No Labour Saving Machine (2012) for tenor and cello
Beautymark Aria (from Dark Star Requiem) (2010) for soprano and piano
Calamus 6 (2010) for soprano and cello
Dark Star Requiem (2010) operatic oratorio for chamber choir, four soloists (SABB), piano trio and two percussion (Libretto by Jill Battson)
At the Laurentian Room (2008) for soprano and piano
Blue (2008) for mezzo-soprano and piano resonance
Made in China (2008) for tenor, percussion and piano
Peter Quince at the Clavier (2008) for baritone and piano
Road to Berlin (2008) for bass and piano
See Saw (2007) chamber opera (Libretto by Anna Chatterton)
Ashlike on the Cradle of the Wind (2005) chamber opera (Libretto by Jill Battson)

Orchestra
Sounds from the Edge (2017)
PHI (2016) with electronics
Reflections on O Canada after Truth and Reconciliation (2016)
Vast Machine (2014)
Four Angels (2013) with electronics
(RE)VOLUTION (2011) Concerto for electric guitar and orchestra
Only Darkness (2010) for orchestra and mezzo soprano
Big Bang! (2008) for percussion and orchestra
Gaia (2007)
Voyageur (2007)
Orchestralympics (2005)
Protestmusik (2004)
Two Movements for Orchestra (2002)
Variations on a Theme by D.H Lawrence (2001) for piano and string orchestra

Symphonic band
Four Horsemen (2012) for symphonic band and electronics

Selected discography

References

External links
 
 

1977 births
Living people
Canadian classical composers
Concert band composers
Musicians from Alberta
People from Red Deer, Alberta
21st-century Canadian composers
21st-century classical composers